"JS" (stylized "J☆S") is Japanese voice actor Mamoru Miyano's fourth single, released on July 29, 2009. It peaked at #24 on the Oricon charts.

Track listing

2009 singles
2009 songs
J-pop songs
King Records (Japan) singles